Rad Aweisat (born October 27, 1986) is a Palestinian swimmer, who specialized in butterfly events. Aweisat qualified for the men's 100 m butterfly, as Palestine's youngest athlete (aged 17), at the 2004 Summer Olympics in Athens. He received a Universality place from FINA as part of his Olympic Solidarity program, without meeting an entry time. He participated in heat one against two other swimmers Luis Matias of Angola and Fernando Medrano of Nicaragua. He rounded out a small field of three to last place with a slowest time of 1:01.60, nearly 11 seconds off the world record set by U.S. swimmer Ian Crocker. Aweisat failed to advance into the semifinals, as he placed fifty-ninth overall in the preliminaries.

References

1986 births
Living people
Palestinian male swimmers
Olympic swimmers of Palestine
Swimmers at the 2004 Summer Olympics
Male butterfly swimmers
Swimmers at the 2002 Asian Games
Asian Games competitors for Palestine